Big Spring is a city in and the county seat of Howard County, Texas, United States, at the crossroads of U.S. Highway 87 and Interstate 20. With a population of 27,282 as of the 2010 census, it is the largest city between Midland to the west, Abilene to the east, Lubbock to the north, and San Angelo to the south. Big Spring was established as the county seat of Howard County in 1882; it is the largest community in the county.

The city took its name from the single, large spring that issued into a small gorge between the base of Scenic Mountain and a neighboring hill in the southwestern part of the city limits. Although the name is sometimes still mistakenly pluralized, it is officially singular. "To the native or established residents who may wince at the plural in Big Spring, it should be explained that until about 1916, when for some unexplained reason the name dropped the final 's', the official name of the town was indeed Big Springs."

History

The area had long been a popular watering hole for Native American residents and nomads, including members of the more recently established Jumano, Apache, and Comanche tribes. The first European to view the site was probably a member of a Spanish expedition exploring the Great Plains from New Mexico. During the 1840s and 1850s Big Spring was often where Comanches assembled and organized themselves before departing on large-scale raids into northern Mexico during the Comanche-Mexico Wars.

Captain Randolph B. Marcy's expedition in 1849 was the first United States expedition to explore and map the area. Marcy marked the spring as a campsite on the Overland Trail to California. The site began to collect inhabitants, and by the late 1870s a settlement had sprung up to support buffalo hunters who frequented the area. The original settlement consisted largely of hide huts and saloons. Ranching quickly became a major industry in the area; early ranchers included F.G. Oxsheer, C.C. Slaughter, and B.F. Wolcott.

One notable early rancher was Briton Joseph Heneage Finch, the Seventh Earl of Aylesford. Finch purchased  of ranchland in the area in 1883, and is credited with building Big Spring's first permanent structure, a butcher's shop.

The completion of the Texas and Pacific Railroad led to the founding in the early 1880s of Abilene, Colorado City, and Big Spring, three railroading and ranching cities where saloons and gambling dens flourished.

More important in the city's history was the discovery of oil in the region during the 1920s. The early discoveries in the area marked the beginning of the oil industry in the Permian Basin area of West Texas, and the oil industry has continued to be a dominant part of the area's economy. The oil industry in Big Spring reached its peak during the oil boom of the 1950s.

Another major part of Big Spring's economy and life during the 1950s, 1960s, and 1970s was Webb Air Force Base. It initially opened during World War II as the Big Spring Bombardier School. Following the war, it was converted to a US Air Force training base and was named for James Webb, a Big Spring native who died in action during World War II. Webb Air Force Base was active until 1977, when the base facilities were deeded to the city.

Big Spring was featured in the 1969 film Midnight Cowboy, which starred Dustin Hoffman and Jon Voight, and received the Academy Award for Best Picture of 1969. The opening scenes featuring Voight, then a relatively unknown actor, playing the character Joe Buck, were filmed in Big Spring and the neighboring city of Stanton.

In 1980, Hollywood returned to Big Spring with the filming of Hangar 18, a low-budget science-fiction movie about a space shuttle's collision with an alien spacecraft and the ensuing government cover-up. Several local residents were used as on-screen extras.

Big Spring is the location for the opening scene of the Robert Rodriguez film From Dusk Till Dawn.

In 1999, a New York energy company erected the first 80-meter tower for one of North America's largest wind turbines for that time at Big Spring.

The FAI World Hang Gliding Championship was hosted by Big Spring in August 2007.

Origin of the name "Big Spring"
The area's "big spring", long dry but recently modified to draw water from Comanche Trail Lake, was of major importance to all life in the surrounding area. In the early 1840s, it was the center of a territorial dispute between Comanche and Pawnee tribes, and has been a major watering hole for wildlife and prehistoric people in this semiarid area. The spring has mistakenly been described in other writings as being located in Sulphur Draw. It is actually located to the south, near the top of a small, rugged, unnamed draw running eastwards from the spring, and is itself a tributary to Beal's Creek, the name given to Sulphur Draw as it flows into, through, and past the city of Big Spring.

Long used by regional inhabitants, both permanent and nomadic, with a large number of locally collected artifacts testifying to its heavy occupation, the spring sat astride the several branches of the later-developed Comanche War Trail as they converged on this important water hole from beyond Texas, coming south across the Northern Plains and the Llano Estacado. From the Big Spring, the war trail continued south via three branches, one to the southeast through the western part of the Concho country; one going almost due south, heading for Castle Gap and Horsehead Crossing on the Pecos River; and one heading west to Willow Springs in the sand country southwest of present Midland, before turning south down the Pecos, all headed ultimately for Mexico. As whites began to settle the western territories, the spring continued to serve as a major watering place on the southern route of the Gold Rush Trail of the early 1850s and continued in use well beyond that time, as the cross-continental trail turned into a major road for later pioneers coming into the area.

The spring was sourced from a relatively small aquifer situated on the northern end of the Edwards Plateau and the southern end of the High Plains, being, structurally, a collecting sink of lower Cretaceous (Fredericksburg) limestones and sands. This writing identifies the sink as one of a number of similar subsurface geologic features in the surrounding area, differing from the Big Spring sink only in the fact that the surface topography above the others, while showing some decline, does not dip low enough to intersect the top of the water tables; hence, no springs could form from the other aquifers. In a passing comment, enigmatic in its content and disappointing in its brevity, the report states no other comparable deep sinks formed elsewhere on the Edwards Plateau.

The water was heavily mined by wells built by both the railroad and the early town of Big Spring, greatly in excess of its modest recharge rate, until the water table first dropped below the level of the spring outlet, and, finally, was completely depleted by the mid-1920s. The city now artificially fills the spring from its current source of water as a means of allowing residents and visitors to maintain some idea of how it appeared in times past.

Geography
Big Spring is located slightly south of the center of Howard County in the valley of Beals Creek, an east-flowing tributary of the Colorado River. Interstate 20 runs through the northern side of the city, with access from exits 174 through 182. I-20 leads east  to Abilene and west  to Midland. U.S. Route 87 (Gregg Street) runs through the center of Big Spring, leading north  to Lubbock and southeast  to San Angelo.

Demographics

2020 census

As of the 2020 United States census, there were 26,144 people, 8,458 households, and 5,127 families residing in the city.

2010 census
As of the census of 2010, 28,187 people,8,029 households, and 5,463 families resided in the city. The population density was 1,428.4 people per square mile (509.8/km2). The  9,865 housing units averaged 516.2 per square mile (199.3/km2). The racial makeup of the city was 76.69% White, 5.31% African American, 0.59% Native American, 0.63% Asian, 0.02% Pacific Islander, 14.41% from other races, and 2.35% from two or more races. Hispanics or Latinos of any race were 44.64% of the population.

Of the 8,155 households, 32.8% had children under the age of 18 living with them, 48.3% were married couples living together, 14.1% had a female householder with no husband present, and 33.0% were not families. About 29.2% of all households were made up of individuals, and 14.6% had someone living alone who was 65 years of age or older. The average household size was 2.51, and the average family size was 3.10.

In the city, the population was distributed as 23.6% under the age of 18, 9.9% from 18 to 24, 32.7% from 25 to 44, 19.7% from 45 to 64, and 14.1% who were 65 years of age or older. The median age was 35 years. For every 100 females, there were 125.2 males. For every 100 females age 18 and over, there were 132.3 males.

The median income for a household in the city was $28,257, and for a family was $35,448. Males had a median income of $27,636 versus $21,863 for females. The per capita income for the city was $14,119. About 17.1% of families and 22.2% of the population were below the poverty line, including 30.0% of those under age 18 and 18.3% of those age 65 or over.

Arts and culture
Big Spring is the site of several major hang-gliding championship tournaments, including the U.S. Hang Gliding Nationals. The city was also the site for the filming of parts of Midnight Cowboy and Hangar 18.

The Big Spring Heritage Museum contains pioneer and indigenous artifacts, art exhibits, and the largest collection known of Texas Longhorn steer horns. Its rare and unusual phonographs include models by Thomas A. Edison. It also houses a large collection of dolls. The museum is located at 510 Scurry; an admission fee is charged.

Points of interest

 Settles Hotel
 Big Spring Municipal Auditorium (a 1,400-seat, city-owned facility, which is home to the Big Spring Symphony and center for local and traveling performances)
 Howard County Courthouse
 Heritage Museum of Big Spring (a 13,000 square foot museum featuring exhibits of local history and interest)
 Potton–Hayden House
 Hangar 25 Air Museum (a museum, housed in a fully restored World War II-era hangar, which promotes education through the collection, preservation, and exhibition of the history of the Big Spring Army Air Force Bombardier School and Webb Air Force Base)
 Big Spring Vietnam Memorial
 Big Spring State Park
 Comanche Trail Park (a 400-acre city park that features the historic "big spring", a 6,900-seat limestone amphitheater, an 18-hole golf course, tennis courts, baseball fields, playgrounds, pavilions, as well as hike, bike and nature trails)
 Moss Creek Lake (a 400-acre recreational area offering a beach swimming area, paintball course, dirt bike course and a playground, as well as an RV park with full hook-ups and 26 sheltered campsites)
 Signal Peak (also called Signal Mountain, a landmark ten miles southeast of Big Spring near Moss Creek Lake, used by Native Americans and early Anglo settlers)
 George H. O'Brien, Jr. VA Medical Center (primary facility for the West Texas VA Health Care System, which serves veterans in 33 counties across 53,000 square miles of West Texas and eastern New Mexico)
 Dorothy Garrett Coliseum
 Panther Creek Wind Farm
 Delek US Refinery (formerly Alon USA)
 McMahon-Wrinkle Industrial Airpark (formerly Webb Air Force Base)

Government
Following the 2011 redistricting, Howard County is represented in the Texas House of Representatives by the District 72 Republican Drew Darby of San Angelo.

Education
 Big Spring Independent School District
 Howard College
 Southwest Collegiate Institute for the Deaf

Media
 Big Spring Herald
 KBST/KBTS Radio
 KBYG-AM Radio
 KWDC (FM) Radio (and translators)
 KBXJ (FM) Radio from neighboring Lamesa, Texas

Infrastructure

Services and facilities
The Texas Department of Criminal Justice operates the Big Spring District Parole Office in the city.

The Texas Department of State Health Services operates a 200-bed psychiatric hospital, opened in 1939. The hospital has reduced its number of beds over the years, but remains one of the largest employers in Big Spring.

The United States Postal Service operates the Big Spring Post Office.

The Federal Bureau of Prisons (BOP) operates the Federal Correctional Institution, Big Spring in Big Spring. The nearby Big Spring Correctional Center is privately operated (GEO Group) on behalf of the BOP.

The Colorado River Municipal Water District operates a reclaimed water treatment plant in Big Spring, the first of its kind in Texas, the product of which is then delivered to the potable water treatment plants of Big Spring, Stanton, Midland, and Odessa.

Organizations
 Big Spring Economic Development Corporation
 Big Spring Area Chamber of Commerce
 Big Spring Convention & Visitors Bureau
 Big Spring Symphony Orchestra and Chorus
 Downtown Revitalization Association
 Keep Big Spring Beautiful

Major roads and highways
  Interstate 20
  U.S. Highway 87
  State Highway 176
  State Highway 350
  Farm to Market Road 669
  Farm to Market Road 700

Notable people

 Larry Arnhart, a writer and scholar, graduated from Big Spring High School in 1967
 Betty Buckley is a Tony Award-winning theater, film, and television actress and singer
 Carl Bunch was the drummer for Buddy Holly during the "Winter Dance Party" tour in 1959 in which Holly died (the Day the Music Died), and later for Hank Williams, Jr. and Roy Orbison
 Putt Choate  was a National Football League (NFL) player for the Green Bay Packers
 Mike Christie was an NHL player for the California Seals and Cleveland Barons
 Ainslee Cox, conductor
 Tony Franklin, professional football player
 Bubba Franks, former NFL tight end for the Green Bay Packers, was born in California, but was raised and played high school football in Big Spring
 Lefty Frizzell, American country music singer-songwriter and honky-tonk singer who led the house band for a local nightclub "Ace of Clubs" in the early 1950s
 Cynthia Fierro Harvey, United Methodist Church bishop
 Jeane Porter Hester, oncologist and co-developer of IBM 2997, the computerized blood cell separator
 Charley Johnson, NFL quarterback for the  St. Louis Cardinals, Houston Oilers, and Denver Broncos
 Dave O'Brien, Western actor
 J. J. Pickle,  Democratic United States Representative from the 10th congressional district of Texas from 1963 to 1995
 Stephan Pyles, creator of New Texas Cuisine and a founding father of haute Southwestern cuisine
 J. T. Smith, professional football player
 Tom Sorley, president/CEO of Rosendin Electric
 Ryan Tannehill, quarterback for the Tennessee Titans
 Jesse Whittenton, NFL player for the Los Angeles Rams and Green Bay Packers, was a member of the 1961 and 1962 NFL-champion Packers
 Ronna Reeves, American country music singer. Nominated by the Academy of Country Music in 1992 for Top New Female Vocalist.

Sister cities
 Hadera, Israel
 San Miguel el Alto, Jalisco, Mexico (2010)

References

External links

 City of Big Spring official website
 Photos of West Texas and the Llano Estacado

Cities in Texas
Cities in Howard County, Texas
County seats in Texas
Micropolitan areas of Texas